The Taennchel is one of the summits of the Vosges Mountains, rising to .

The general area around the crest, which is 6 km long, is enigmatic.  The ground is strewn with rocks and various inscriptions, many of them undeciphered and remaining mysterious.  Another curiosity is the "pagan wall" which covers its sides and whose origin is unknown.

The summit shelters numerous vegetable and animal species, including the lynx, which was reintroduced to the area during the 20th century.

Geography

Location

The peak of the mountain, situated opposite to the Haut-Koenigsbourg, in the massif des Vosges, separates the valley of Ribeauvillé from the val de Lièpvre on a surface of about 800 hectares. On the north-east of the Taennchel hides the village of Thannenkirch, and south from the mountain can be reached the old glass arts of the Ribeaupierre which overhang the rocky blocks of the Mittelberg (about 600 metres), the Venuskopf and the Schelmenkopf (905 m). The Taennchel is one of the summits which, from west to east, make up the continental divide between the basin of the Liepvrette up north and the one of the Strengbach down south. It's a huge mountain, its sides are widely open and strongly backed up on the side of the valley of the Liepvrette, while on the opposite side towards Ribeauvillé, it hollows out vertically in a grandiose cirque around the small twin valleys of the Big and Little Glass Art. The Taennchel has the shape of a crescent extending on almost 4 kilometers from the rock of the Rammelstein which is 988 meters high to the mountain which overhangs the low Taennchel from where can be seen the three ruined castles belonging to the sires of Ribeaupierre : Haut-Ribeaupierre, Saint-Ulrich and Girsberg.

North-West can be reached the forest area of the Hury (named in old documents Jefurthe) which belong to Sainte-Croix-aux-Mines. The forests of the Hury, Hinterwald and Kaelblin were part of the goods of the priory of Lièpvre until the high Middle Age as shown by the Charlemagne charter signed in 774. Then the Hinterwald and the Kaelblin were taken up by the Alsatian neighbours following the change of those villages landlords, hence frequent frictions between the monks of Saint-Denis' abbey and the Alsatian towns. Those disputes poisoned relations between Alsace and Saint-Denis' abbey and also the Duchy of Lorraine until 1718.

Aside the North-East point rises the Rock of Crows which dominates an abrupt side and lets appear rocks with strange and impressive bends. A bit farther stands the Rock-shelter with the shape of a cave. The Pointed Rock (or Sharp Rock) looks like a seated boar. Bad weather, winds and storms gnawed at its outward side, letting visible quartzite stones of several colours. Not far from this place stand cracked rocks, made of huge units and a bit farther can be seen the beginning of the pagan wall.

According to tradition this place was dedicated to hunting, and the Lords of Ribeaupierre shut away and fed there stags and does. However this place was not intended for such a use, for the reason that its wall isn't closed and could never have been built for that use.

Hydrology
There are three sources south of the massif that supply with water the Ilbach and the Beam of the Petite Verrerie and an eastern source from which waters all flow into the Strengbach upstream from Ribeauvillé.

At North, the number of harnessed sources is the most important and they supply with water the Liepvrette.

Geology
The Taennchel stands on a basis of gneiss from Precambrian, its base is made of granite from the upper Carboniferous (about 300 million years) and is covered with a strong sheet of sandstone from the Triassic (about 200 million years) which wraps in horizontal layers the summits and the sides of the mountain.

Etymology
Some say that the "Thannen" fir would have given its name to the massif of Taennchel ; other say it would come from Tan or Taen which means oak bark.

According to Robert Forrer, a famous archaeologist who studied the Mont Sainte-Odile between 1898 and 1899 and published several books or articles devoted to medieval time, "Taennchel" would come from the Gallic word dunon or dunom which meansfortified wall.

The name "Taennchel" was first quoted in an archive document from 1357. Its name appears then under various spellings : Taennchel in 1441, Thennichel in 1473, Dannchel in 1538, Tenchel in 1416, Thaennchel, Tannchel, Dannichel, Taennchel, Tännel in 1871 and Taennchel starting to 1918.

The famous rocks

See also

Bibliography
 Armand Hampé, Du haut des sommets vosgiens, guide panoramique et géologique, Éditions Coprur, Strasbourg, 2001 
 Guy Trendel, Le Taennchel, la montagne aux mystères, Éditions Coprur, 1994 
 L.G Werner, Contribution à l'étude du Taennchel, Bulletin de la Société Industrielle de Mulhouse, 1927
 Fritz Kessler, Les murs dits païens de l'Alsace, Bulletin de la Société Industrielle de Mulhouse, 1913
 Adolphe Landspurg : Hauts-lieux d'énergie, Alsace - Vosges - Forêt-Noire, Éditions du Rhin, Strasbourg, 2000 
 André Philippe Grandidier, Histoire ecclésiastique, militaire, civile et littéraire de la province Alsace, Argentorati, Lrenzii et Schulerii (Tome I) et Levrault (Tome II), 1787
 Christophe Carmona, Bernard Riebel, Marc Schultz,  Haut-Koenigsbourg, Frankenbourg, Taennchel, triangle tellurique, I.D L'Édition, Rosheim, 2005, 
 Les 120 ans du Club vosgien, numéro spécial, 67 pages, N° 7, décembre 1992 (Cercle de Recherches Historiques de Ribeauvillé et environs)
 Félix Voulot, A.B.C. d'une Science nouvelle : Les Vosges avant l'histoire,  Veuve Bader et Cie, Mulhouse, 1872
 Les bornes armoriées du ban de Ribeauvillé - Pierres remarquables et histoires insolites, Revue historique de Ribeauvillé et environs - Bulletin N°15 - Décembre 2006 -  
  Henri Kugler, Bann-un andere Grenzsteine in Ribeauvillé, Bulletin N°20, Société d'histoire et d'archéologie de Ribeauvillé, année 1957.
 Jean-Paul Patris, La vallée de Sainte Marie-aux-Mines : l'étrange et le merveilleux - Éditions Oberlin, Strasbourg, 1990

Press review
 Claude Jouve : Note du Naturel Elsass, octobre 1991, Éd. Alsacienne du Guide, Bulletin 143, Sélestat
 André Lemblé : À la découverte du Massif du Tennchel - Les Vosges, organe du Club vosgien n°3, 1999, p. 8-9
 L'Alsace du 30 - Taennchel : les archéologues enthousiastes (Édition de la Moyenne Alsace)
 L'Alsace du 3 - Archéologies allemands et autrichiens au Taennchel
 L'Alsace du 19 - Les mystères du Taennchel (article signé Lucien Naegelen)
 L'Alsace du 15 - Taennchel : messieurs les archéologues ...
 L'Alsace du 9 - Nature : un lynx dans le viseur et sur la crête de la vallée (article signé Georges Jung)
  Lucien Naegelen, W. Knaus : Magazine 2000plus, N°199 - Der Zauber von Tennchel, p. 72-74
  J.P. Dillenseger : Der Taennchel die Unberkannnte Stätte der Götter - Freudeskreis Geomantie, janvier 2000
 Charles Albert Spindler : Le Taennchel sauvage, p. 5-8, Les Vosges N°4, 1996, organe du Club vosgien
 Jean Daniel Kientz : Magique Taennchel - Saisons d'Alsace N°32, septembre 2006

Notes and references

Mountains of Haut-Rhin
Mountains under 1000 metres
Mountains of the Vosges